Viktor Kuznetsov (born 27 November 1949) is a former international speedway rider from the Soviet Union.

Speedway career 
Kuznetsov reached the final of the Speedway World Championship in the 1985 Individual Speedway World Championship and the 1985 Individual Speedway World Championship. He won the Soviet Union Individual Speedway Championship in 1982.

World final appearances

Individual World Championship
 1985 -  Bradford, Odsal Stadium - 15th - 2pts
 1986 -  Chorzów, Silesian Stadium - 6th - 10pts

World Team Cup
 1981 -  Olching, Speedway Stadion Olching (with Valery Gordeev / Mikhail Starostin /  Nikolay Kornev / Anatoly Maksimov) - 4th - 3pts (2)

References 

1949 births
Living people
Russian speedway riders
Sportspeople from Tomsk